The Evening Telegram Trophy is presented to the team with the best record in the senior A hockey leagues operating in Newfoundland and Labrador.

History
The owners of the Evening Telegram newspaper originally donated a trophy in 1954 to be presented annually to the champions of the new senior section 'B' division of the Newfoundland Amateur Hockey Association. The section B league was formed for teams with no 'import' or paid players on their roster. The B Division was disbanded after the 1959 Championships and the Evening Telegram Trophy was retired. 

The trophy was not awarded in 1960 & 1961. In 1962, the Trophy was awarded to the winner of the senior league's new Eastern Division. (The S.E. Tuma Trophy, donated by the Corner Brook jewellery firm, was awarded to the 1962 Western Division champions). From 1963 thru 1989, the newly formed island-wide Newfoundland Senior Hockey League team that finished first place in the regular season was presented with the Evening Telegram Trophy. The NSHL disbanded after 1989 and the trophy was not awarded from 1990 thru 1992. 

Beginning in 1993, the trophy was awarded to the team with the best winning average among the existing senior 'A' leagues in the province.

Winners

References

Bibliography

External links
See also: Abbott, Bill. Herder Memorial Trophy: A History of Senior Hockey in Newfoundland and Labrador (St. John's: Breakwater Books, 2000), 

Canadian ice hockey trophies and awards
Ice hockey in Newfoundland and Labrador
Newfoundland and Labrador awards